Beška is a village in Serbia. It is situated in the Autonomous Province of Vojvodina, in the region of Syrmia (Syrmia District), in Inđija municipality. The village has a Serb ethnic majority and a population numbering 6,239 people (2002 census).

History and Archeology
Roman tombs with rich decorative paintings dating back to the third or the fourth century were discovered in Beška.

It was first mentioned in 1564. During Ottoman rule (16th-17th century) the village of Beška was populated by Serbs. During Habsburg rule, ethnic Germans settled there. Following World War II in Yugoslavia, the German population fled the village, while new inhabitants mostly from Croatia settled in the village in place of the Germans.

The archeological site of Kalakača includes findings of Early Bosut culture with traits of Gava culture dating to the 9th century BC. The site is part of the Cultural Heritage of Serbia list, inscribed in 1995.

Demographics

Ethnic groups

4,766 (76.39%) Serbs
506 (8.11%) Croats
208 (3.33%) Yugoslavs
137 (2.20%) Hungarians
89 (1.43%) Romani
others.

Historical population

1961: 5,378
1971: 6,351
1981: 6,377
1991: 6,166
2002: 6,239

Gallery

See also
List of places in Serbia
List of cities, towns and villages in Vojvodina

References
Slobodan Ćurčić, Broj stanovnika Vojvodine, Novi Sad, 1996. Stanimirović i Kosovac Starćević familia Stanimirović podreklom .
Dr. Dušan J. Popović, Srbi u Vojvodini, knjiga 1, Novi Sad, 1990.

References

External links 

Beška
Beška - www.upoznajsrbiju.co.rs

Populated places in Syrmia